Illuminations is a solo album by cellist Erik Friedlander which was released in 2015 on the Skipstone label. The music was commissioned by the Jewish Museum in New York City to commemorate an exhibit of ancient Arabic, Latin and Hebrew books from Oxford University's Bodleian Collection.

Reception
Writing for All About Jazz, Enrico Bettinello said "this little gem, in its apparent simplicity, has the merit of going to the heart of sound and the gesture itself. Very exciting".

Track listing
All compositions by Erik Friedlander.
 "Invocation - Seshat" 2:40
 "Prelude - Scriptorium" - 6:16
 "Madrigal - Siddur" - 4:40
 "Chant - Illuminations" - 3:51
 "Cham - Hypnotique" - 3:08
 "Tarantella - The Serpent" - 4:49
 "Fantasia - Zodiac" - 3:46
 "Chant - Kaddish" - 4:20
 "Madrigal - The Virgin & The Unicorn" - 4:07
 "Pavan - Hildegard" - 4:35

Personnel
Erik Friedlander – cello

References 

2015 albums
Erik Friedlander albums